Kiki Bertens and Johanna Larsson were the defending champions, but Bertens chose not to participate. Larsson played alongside Mona Barthel, but lost in the semifinals to Hsieh Shu-ying and Hsieh Su-wei.

Choi Ji-hee and Han Na-lae won the title, defeating Hsieh and Hsieh in the final, 6–3, 6–2.

Seeds

Draw

Draw

References
Main Draw

Korea Open - Doubles
2018 Doubles
2018 Korea Open